Munger is an unincorporated community in northeast Reynolds County, in the U.S. state of Missouri.

The community is on Missouri Route N approximately one-third of a mile south of the Reynolds-Iron county line. It is approximately 8.5 miles west of Ironton and 4.5 miles northeast of Johnson's Shut-Ins State Park. The East Fork of the Black River flows past the community.

History
An early variant name was "Mungers Mill". A post office called Munger was established in 1884, and remained in operation until 1932. The community has the name of the local Munger family.

References

Unincorporated communities in Reynolds County, Missouri
Unincorporated communities in Missouri